Emilia Simonen (born January 12, 1996) is a Finnish pair skater. With her partner, Matthew Penasse, she is the 2017 Finnish National Champion. They competed at the 2017 World Championships, becoming the first Finnish pair skaters to compete at World Championships since 1983.

Personal life
Simonen's grandparents competed in pair skating in the 1950s and were Finnish National Champions.

Career

Single skating
Simonen competed in single skating at the Finnish Championships at the Junior level in 2012 and 2013.

Pair skating

Simonen teamed up with Matthew Penasse in the 2016 summer. They won the 2017 Finnish Championships in December 2016. They qualified for the 2017 Worlds at their first international competition together, the 2017 Bavarian Open. At the World Championships they skated a new personal best i their short program and placed 25th. The Finnish Figure Skating Association stated on 18 May 2017 that Simonen and Penasse had ended their partnership, and both were searching for new partners.

Programs 
(with Penasse)

References

External links
 

Finnish pair skaters
Finnish female single skaters
1996 births
Living people
People from Kuopio
Sportspeople from North Savo